Kaito is a Japanese surname and a male given name.

Kaito may also refer to:

People
 Baruto Kaito (born 1984), Estonian professional sumo wrestler
 Kaito Yamamoto (born 1985), Japanese football player

Characters
 Kaito Kumon, Kamen Rider Baron in Kamen Rider Gaim
 Kaito Takahaya, a Japanese naval commander in The Last Ship
 Kaito Momota, a character in Danganronpa V3: Killing Harmony

Other uses
 Kaitō "phantom thief" or gentleman thief genre in Japanese fiction
 KaitO, an independent rock band from the United Kingdom
 KAITO, Crypton Future Media's Character Voice, created for the Vocaloid/Piapro Editor.
 Kaito, sometimes Kai-to, a type of small ferry in Hong Kong

See also
 Cato (disambiguation)
 Kato (disambiguation)